In Ohio, State Route 71 may refer to:
Interstate 71 in Ohio, the only Ohio highway numbered 71 since about 1962
Ohio State Route 71 (1923), now SR 571

71